The Hi Bug Historic District is a residential area of Red Lodge, Montana. The district is on the north side of Villard Avenue (U.S. Route 212) and includes portions of Hauser Avenue. The district includes a variety of mansions and Victorian cottages in the Queen Anne and Colonial Revival styles. The name is thought to be derived from the affluence of the neighborhood's residents in the early 1900s.

The Hi Bug Historic District was listed on the National Register of Historic Places on July 13, 1986.  The listing included 80 contributing resources and 18 non-contributing ones.

References

External links
Hi Bug Historic District Contributing Properties at the Montana History Wiki

Houses on the National Register of Historic Places in Montana
Houses in Carbon County, Montana
Historic districts on the National Register of Historic Places in Montana
National Register of Historic Places in Carbon County, Montana
Queen Anne architecture in Montana
Colonial Revival architecture in Montana